Sleepwalkers is an American science fiction series which began airing on NBC in late 1997. It tells the story of a team of researchers who used technology to enter the dreams of psychiatric patients in order to diagnose their problems.  It briefly revived NBC's Saturday night supernatural/paranormal programming block, Thrillogy, but the show was canceled after two episodes.

The show was created by Stephen Kronish and David S. Goyer.

Cast
Bruce Greenwood as Dr. Nathan Bradford
Naomi Watts as Kate Russell
Abraham Benrubi as Vincent Konefke
Kathrin Nicholson as Gail Bradford
Jeffrey D. Sams as Ben Costigan

Cancellation
Although nine episodes were produced, NBC canceled national airings of the series after just two episodes. Five episodes went on to be seen only on the West Coast and the show's final two episodes were never broadcast in the United States but did air elsewhere.

Episodes

Releases
All nine episodes were released on VHS in Japan during the late '90s by Columbia TriStar Home Video, but were rental-only titles and could not be purchased directly.

Warner Vision in Germany released most of the episodes on DVD as both individual PAL Region 2 titles and as box sets. The German releases feature a Dolby Digital 5.1 track in German, but the English track is the same Dolby Surround that the show was originally broadcast in.

On October 20, 2005 it was released by Warner Bros. Home Entertainment in Australia as a three-disc set but it only features six of the episodes in random order. Each disc features two 45-minute episodes combined into one 90-minute film  ("Something Is Buried in Bethlehem – Night Terror," "Forlorn – Counting Sheep," and "Eye of The Beholder – A Matter of Fax").

To date, Sony Pictures Home Entertainment does not currently have any plans of releasing the show on DVD in the United States.

Shout! Factory listed a complete series DVD set as part of their inventory, but it is unknown whether the company ever released it or whether it is currently available.

Mill Creek Entertainment announced the complete series on DVD, but has to date made no efforts to release it.

See also
Paprika, a 2006 anime film by Satoshi Kon that features a similar premise

References

External links
 
 

1997 American television series debuts
1998 American television series endings
1990s American science fiction television series
English-language television shows
NBC original programming
Television series created by David S. Goyer
Television series by Universal Television
Television series by Sony Pictures Television
Television shows about dreams